Takao (written: 貴男, 貴雄, 隆男, 隆雄, 隆夫, 高男, 高生, 孝男, 孝雄, 孝夫, 孝生, 孝朗, 京夫 or たかお in hiragana) is a masculine Japanese given name. Notable people with the name include:

, Japanese politician
, Japanese manga artist
, Japanese astronaut
, Japanese politician
, Japanese politician
, Japanese ice hockey player
, Japanese singer
Takao Isokawa (born 1984), Japanese sport wrestler
, Japanese ski jumper
, Japanese baseball player
, Japanese judoka
, Japanese singer and composer
, Japanese civil servant
, Japanese astronomer
, Japanese rower
, Japanese screenwriter and writer
, Japanese baseball player
, Japanese politician
, Japanese film director, screenwriter and actor
, Japanese footballer
Takao Nogami (born 1971), Japanese golfer
, Japanese baseball player and manager
, Japanese politician
, Japanese footballer
, Japanese film director
, Japanese professional wrestler
, Japanese actor
, Japanese manga artist
, Japanese politician
, Japanese cinematographer
, Japanese bobsledder
, Japanese high jumper
, Japanese boxer
, Japanese tennis player
, Japanese sociolinguist
Takao Tanabe (born 1926), Canadian painter
Takao Wada (born 1953), Japanese racing driver
, Japanese politician
, Japanese footballer
, Japanese screenwriter

Takao (written: 高雄 or 高尾) is also a Japanese surname. Notable people with the surname include:
, Japanese tennis player
, Japanese Go player

Fictional characters
Takao Kinomiya, a character from the anime series Beyblade

See also
Japanese ship Takao

Japanese-language surnames
Japanese masculine given names